Deh-e Jami (also Romanized as Deh-e Jāmī, Deh-ī-Jāmī, and Deh Jāmī; also known as Dīh-ī-Jāmī) is a village in Bivanij Rural District, in the Central District of Dalahu County, Kermanshah Province, Iran. At the 2006 census, its population was 293, in 71 families.

References 

Populated places in Dalahu County